The Treaty of Lyon may refer to:

 The Treaty of Lyon (1504), in which Louis XII of France cedes Naples to Ferdinand II of Aragon
 The Treaty of Lyon (1601), in which Henry IV of France cedes Saluzzo to Savoy in exchange for Bresse, Bugey, Valromey, and Gex